Wyszewka is a small river of Poland. Southeast of Koszalin it flows into the lake Lubiatowo Wschodnie, which is drained by the Dzierżęcinka. 

Rivers of Poland
Rivers of West Pomeranian Voivodeship